Nuvance Health is a not-for-profit health system with facilities spanning from New York State's Hudson Valley region to western Connecticut. Nuvance Health was formed in 2019 when Health Quest and Western Connecticut Health Network merged. It employs approximately 2,600 physicians and 12,000 ancillary staff, and serves approximately 1.5 million residents.

Member hospitals 
The following hospitals are part of the Nuvance Health system:

New York
 Vassar Brothers Medical Center - Poughkeepsie, NY
 Northern Dutchess Hospital - Rhinebeck, NY
 Putnam Hospital Center - Carmel, NY

Connecticut
 Danbury Hospital - Danbury, CT
 New Milford Hospital - New Milford, CT
 Norwalk Hospital - Norwalk, CT
 Sharon Hospital - Sharon, CT

West and East
The Nuvance Health organization is divided into West and East sections, where the New York locations are generally part of the West section and Connecticut locations are generally part of the East section. Exceptions include Sharon Hospital, which is part of the West section.

Training programs

For resident physicians 

*these specialties have multiple residency programs, each headquartered at different hospitals

For fellow physicians

References 

Medical and health organizations based in Connecticut
Companies based in Danbury, Connecticut